Nancy Naeve was a news co-anchor of KSFY News weekday mornings on KSFY-TV in Sioux Falls, South Dakota.

Biography
Nancy Naeve was born and raised in Spencer, Iowa.  In 1990, she graduated from the University of South Dakota with a Bachelor of Arts degree in communication and a minor in Spanish.  In June 1992, Naeve joined the KSFY-TV news team.  In 1999, she and Mitch Krebs became co-anchors of the 6:00pm and 10:00pm newscasts at KSFY-TV until Krebs departure a few years later. Later, Nancy co-anchored with Shawn Cable every weekday morning on KSFY News from 5:00-7:00 AM.  She left that post in May 2015.

External links
Nancy Naeve's biography

Living people
People from Spencer, Iowa
People from Sioux Falls, South Dakota
South Dakota television reporters
South Dakota television anchors
Journalists from South Dakota
Year of birth missing (living people)
University of South Dakota alumni